Franziska Gräfin zu Königsegg-Aulendorf (3 July 1814 – 22 April 1871) was a German noblewoman.

Her parents were Graf Franz Xavier Karl zu Königsegg-Aulendorf and Countess Mária Anna Károlyi de Nagykároly. Her grandfather was Count József Károlyi. She married Count György Andrássy in 1834. They had four children (including Count Dénes Andrássy).

The Andrássy heritage
Her elder son Dénes entered into a misalliance with Franciska Hablawetz from a Viennese bourgeois family in 1866 in Pisa. The parents strongly opposed their son's decision, but could not prevent the marriage. György Andrássy excluded Dénes from the heritage in 1866. Their youngest son, György Jr. became the new heir but died suddenly in 1871, Madeira. György Sr. died in 1872. Dénes regained his original birthright.

References

External links
 

1797 births
1872 deaths
People from Aulendorf
People from the Kingdom of Württemberg
German countesses
Franziska zu Koenigsegg-Aulendorf
Hungarian people of German descent